Salah Al-Din Reda Mostafa Mostafa Ahmed Basha (born 5 March 2003), known as Salah Basha, is a professional footballer who plays as a forward for  club Giugliano. Born in Italy, he is a youth international for Egypt.

Club career
Born in Verona, Italy, to an Egyptian father and Italian mother, Basha started his career with Italian giants AC Milan and Juventus. Due to his father's work, Basha relocated to South Sinai, Egypt, where he played for Sharm El Sheikh Sporting Club. He was soon scouted and signed by Egyptian top division side Al Ahly in 2016.

Having lived in Egypt with his mother and brother, Basha returned to Italy when his father became sick. On his return, he signed for Serie A side Udinese, who he had trialled with in January 2018.

He was named on the bench for Udinese for the first time in the penultimate game of the 2020–21 Serie A season, a 1–0 loss to Sampdoria, but did not feature.

On 27 January 2023, Basha signed with Giugliano in Serie C.

International career
Basha is eligible to represent both Italy and Egypt at international level. He has represented Egypt at youth international level.

Personal life
Salah's brother, Richard, is also a footballer, and moved to Udinese with him before leaving to join Swiss Super League club Lugano in 2021.

References

External links

2003 births
Living people
Footballers from Verona
Egyptian footballers
Egypt youth international footballers
Italian footballers
Egyptian people of Italian descent
Italian people of Egyptian descent
Association football forwards
A.C. Milan players
Juventus F.C. players
Al Ahly SC players
Udinese Calcio players
S.S.C. Giugliano players